Epitolina catori, the red-patch epitolina, is a butterfly in the family Lycaenidae. It is found in Sierra Leone, Ivory Coast, Ghana, Togo, Nigeria, Cameroon, the Central African Republic, the Democratic Republic of the Congo, Uganda and Tanzania. Its habitat consists of forests.

Subspecies
Epitolina catori catori (Sierra Leone, Ivory Coast, Ghana, Togo, Nigeria: south and the Cross River loop, western Cameroon)
Epitolina catori ugandae Jackson, 1962 (Central African Republic, Democratic Republic of the Congo, Uganda, north-western Tanzania)

References

Butterflies described in 1904
Poritiinae